The 2019 Eastern Cape provincial election was held on 8 May 2019, concurrently with the 2019 South African general election, to elect the 63 members of the Eastern Cape Provincial Legislature. The election was won by the African National Congress, the incumbent governing party in the province.

Premier candidates
The African National Congress did not announce its premier candidate prior to the election. The incumbent premier Phumulo Masualle was 39th on the ANC's national list for the National Assembly election. Oscar Mabuyane, the party's incumbent provincial chairperson, was first on the provincial list for the provincial election. After the election, he announced as the party's premier candidate by the party's National Executive Committee.

In September 2018, the official opposition, the Democratic Alliance, announced its provincial leader, Nqaba Bhanga as the party's premier candidate for the provincial election.

The Economic Freedom Fighters did not announce a premier candidate since the party wants to abolish provinces, however, its provincial chairperson Yazini Tetyana was first on the party's list for the election.

The United Democratic Movement placed its national chairperson Mncedisi Filtane first on its candidate list.

Former DA provincial chairwoman Veliswa Mvenya was chosen as the African Transformation Movement's premier candidate.

On 5 March 2019, the Freedom Front Plus announced their provincial leader Piet Mey as their premier candidate.

Congress of the People Member of the Provincial Legislature, Rev. Lievie Sharpley was chosen as COPE's premier candidate.

Results

Aftermath
On 22 May 2019, members of the Eastern Cape Provincial Legislature were sworn in during the first sitting of the provincial legislature after the election and Oscar Masbuyane was elected as the provincial premier, while Helen Sauls-August was elected speaker with Mlibo Qoboshiyane as deputy speaker.

References

2019 elections in South Africa